Chino High School (CHS), located in Chino, California is one of the four regular high schools in the Chino Valley Unified School District. The school was established in 1897, making it one of the oldest schools in Southern California. Chino High moved from its original location in 1951 to its present location on Park Place and Benson Ave.

Academics
In 2007, the rate of passing the English-Language Arts section of the California High School Exit Exam for sophomores was 76% and the rate of graduating seniors was approximately 70%. Dropout rates continue to stay low at less than 10% in 2008, Chino High School was recertified by the Western Association of Schools and Colleges for three years.

Demographics
The demographic breakdown of the 2,498 students enrolled for the 2012-2013 school year was:
Male - 49.0%
Female - 51.0%
Native American/Alaskan - 0.2%
Asian/Pacific islander - 4.0%
Black - 3.5%
Hispanic - 75.4%
White - 16.3%
Multiracial - 0.6%

In addition, 57% of the students were eligible for free or reduced lunch.

Athletics
Chino High School is a member of the California Interscholastic Federation Hacienda League in the southern section. Division 6

Notable alumni

Sedrick Ellis, former NFL defensive tackle
Geoff Blum, professional baseball player.
Jarron Gilbert, former NFL defensive end
Justin Jacobs, professional baseball player
Elita Loresca, Meteorologist for NBC 4 in Los Angeles, voted 9th "Hottest Weather Girl" by FHM Magazine
Chris McFoy, former NFL wide receiver
Greg Salas, former NFL wide receiver
R. J. Stanford, former NFL cornerback
Mark Vander Poel, former NFL offensive tackle
Angela Williams, four times 100 meter NCAA champion at USC, world indoor 60 meter champion, current high school 100 meter record holder.
Tony Zendejas, former NFL kicker

References

External links

Educational institutions established in 1897
High schools in San Bernardino County, California
Chino, California
Public high schools in California
1897 establishments in California